Vista Ridge High School (VRHS) is a high school in Cedar Park, Texas. The school was established in 2003 to serve as the 3rd high school in the Leander Independent School District, graduating its Alpha class June 2007. The school was built due to the rapid growth in the area, and continues to grow with the recent construction of its auditorium and John Gupton Stadium. Vista Ridge is a part of the 6A UIL Conference as of the 2021 - 2022 school year.

Feeds
The following middle schools feed into VRHS:

 Artie Henry Middle School (majority)
 Florence Stiles Middle School (majority)
 Cedar Park Middle School (minority)
 Running Brushy Middle School (minority)
 Bernice Knox Wiley Middle School (minority)

Academics

Science
 Vista Ridge won the Sweepstakes Award at the Austin Regional Science Fair in 2005, 2006, 2007, 2008, 2009, 2010, 2012, 2013, 2014, 2015, 2016, 2017, 2018, and 2019.

Extra-curricular

Navy Junior Reserve Officer Training Corps

Vista Ridge is home to a Navy Junior Reserve Officer Training Corps. Vista Ridge's NJROTC program, the Lone Star Company, was awarded Distinguished Unit 2012-present. The unit has been #2 in top units of Area 10 from 2017-present. The unit has an Air Rifle Marksmanship team, both Armed and Unarmed drill teams, a Color Guard team, Academics, PT, Orienteering and Cyber Patriot teams.

Marching Band
The Ranger Marching Band has been invited to the 2023 Rose Parade in Pasadena, California.
UIL 6A Texas State Marching Band Contest Champions: 2018
UIL 6A Area H Marching Band Contest Champion: 2018, 2021, 2022
Bands of America Grand National Finalist: 2021
Bands of America Midland Regional Champions: 2019 
Bands of America Austin Regional Best Visual Performance Award: 2018
Bands of America Austin Regional Best Music Performance Award: 2016

Robotics 
Vista Ridge is home to 3 FIRST Tech Challenge teams, Static Void, Victorian Voltage, and Rogue Resistance.

Notable alumni
 Tyler Patmon, NFL player, with the Jacksonville Jaguars.
Khiry Shelton, MLS player, with Sporting Kansas City.
Will Licon, swimmer for the University of Texas, 11-time NCAA Champion, American Record-holder

References

External links
VRHS page
VRHS Overview
The Word webpage

Educational institutions established in 2003
High schools in Williamson County, Texas
Leander Independent School District high schools
Cedar Park, Texas
2003 establishments in Texas